Carl von Rosenstein (born Carl Aurivillius; 13 May 1766 –  2 December 1836) was the Church of Sweden Bishop of Linköping from 1809 to 1819 and Archbishop of Uppsala from 1819 to 1836.

Biography
Rosenstein was born in Uppsala, Sweden. He was the son of professor Samuel Aurivillius and Anna Margaretha Rosén von Rosenstein. He belonged to the Swedish nobility. The "von Rosenstein" surname was his mother's family name which came through an adoption. His maternal grandfather was Uppsala University professor of medicine Nils Rosén von Rosenstein (1706–1773).

He attended   Uppsala University where he first studied classical literature followed by theology. In 1786, at the age of 20, Rosenstein defended his PhD. He was ordained a priest in 1791 after becoming master of primus and associate professor of theology in 1790. In 1792 he became theology liceniat.  He served as a theology lecturer at the University of Uppsala, leaving in 1796 to become  pastor in the pastorate of Kumla and Hallsberg.  In  1809, he was appointed Bishop of the Diocese of Linköping and in 1819 Archbishop of Uppsala.
He was also a member of the Royal Swedish Academy of Sciences from 1809 and of the Swedish Academy from 1819.

References

1766 births
1836 deaths
People from Uppsala
Lutheran archbishops of Uppsala
Lutheran bishops of Linköping
19th-century Lutheran archbishops
Members of the Royal Swedish Academy of Sciences
Members of the Swedish Academy
Burials at Uppsala old cemetery